Andrea Locatelli (born 16 October 1996 in Alzano Lombardo) is an Italian motorcycle racer, set to compete in the 2022 Superbike World Championship for Yamaha. He is the 2020 Supersport world champion.

Career

Early career
In 2012, Locatelli was the winner of the 2012 Italian Honda NSF250R Trophy, and in 2013, he was the 2013 CIV Moto3 Champion.

Moto3 World Championship
For the 2013 Moto3 World Championship, Locatelli was given two wild-card appearances, for the races in Italy and San Marino. He did not score any points however, finishing in 22nd and 25th.

San Carlo Team Italia (2014)
For the 2014 season, Locatelli was given a full time ride in Mahindra's San Carlo Team Italia, partnered by Matteo Ferrari. Locatelli did not score a single point during the entire season, Ferrari earned 12.

Gresini Racing Team Moto3 (2015)
For the 2015 season, Locatelli was given a full time ride by Gresini Racing, partnered by Francesco Bagnaia. Locatelli earned his first points that season, finishing with 33, and a best place finish of 7th. Bagnaia finished with 76 points, and a podium.

Leopard Racing (2016)
For the 2016 season, Locatelli switched to Leopard Racing, partnering Joan Mir. Locatelli had his best season, finishing 9th in the standings with 96 points, and also had two second place podiums in Germany and in Australia. Mir finished the championship in 5th position as rookie of the year, scoring 144 points.

Moto2 World Championship

Italtrans Racing Team (2017–2019)
For the 2017 season, Locatelli moved up to Moto2, riding for Kalex's Italtrans team. He was partnered by Mattia Pasini, who finished with one win and two other podiums, while Locatelli finished in the points just three times, scoring 8 points total for the season. This marked the fourth straight season where Locatelli's teammate finished ahead of him in the championship standings.

In the 2018 season, Locatelli and Mattia Pasini both stayed with the Italtrans team. Once again, Pasini won a race and finished with 141 points, while Locatelli struggled, finishing with 52 points, and a season best of an 8th place, in his home race of Italy.

In his final Moto2 season of 2019, Locatelli was teamed up with Enea Bastianini at Italtrans. Bastianini scored a podium and 97 points, and following Locatelli finishing with 46, he was not renewed by the team.

Supersport World Championship
For the 2020 season, Locatelli received an offer from Yamaha Motor Company, in the Supersport class. Riding the Yamaha YZF-R6, Locatelli dominated in his rookie season, winning the first 9 races of the year, winning 12 out of 15 races total, finishing on the podium 13 times, and having just one DNF. He beat second place Lucas Mahias by 104 points in the overall standings.

Superbike World Championship
In 2021, he moved up to the Superbike World Championship, riding for Yamaha, next to Toprak Razgatlioglu. Locatelli scored four podiums, all four being 3rd place finishes during the season.

Career statistics

Grand Prix motorcycle racing

By season

By class

Races by year
(key) (Races in bold indicate pole position; races in italics indicate fastest lap)

Supersport World Championship

Races by year
(key) (Races in bold indicate pole position; races in italics indicate fastest lap)

Superbike World Championship

Races by year
(key) (Races in bold indicate pole position; races in italics indicate fastest lap)

* Season still in progress.

References

External links

1996 births
Living people
Italian motorcycle racers
Moto3 World Championship riders
People from Alzano Lombardo
Moto2 World Championship riders
Supersport World Championship riders
Superbike World Championship riders
Sportspeople from the Province of Bergamo